L. albiventris  may refer to:
 Leptodactylodon albiventris, a frog species endemic to Cameroon
 Leptoconops albiventris, the white nono, nono blanc des plages or nono purutia, a midge species found in Polynesia